The City is a lost 1916 silent film based on Clyde Fitch's 1909 play, The City. It was distributed by the World Film Company.

Cast
Thurlow Bergen - George Rand, Jr.
Riley Hatch - George Rand, Sr. (*as William Riley Hatch)
Elsie Esmond - Emily Rand
Bessie Wharton - Mary Hale (*Bessie E. Wharton)
F. W. Stewart - Jim Hammock, Sr. (*as Richard Stewart)
Allan Murnane - Hannock, Jr.
Betty Borden -

References

External links
The City @ IMDb.com

1916 films
American silent feature films
Lost American films
American films based on plays
1916 drama films
Silent American drama films
American black-and-white films
World Film Company films
1916 lost films
Lost drama films
1910s American films